P. Kim Sturgess, C.M., DSc., LLD, MBA, P.Eng., FCAE, ICD.D is a Canadian engineer. In 2011, she served as president of the Canadian Academy of Engineering. Sturgess has been involved in the development of water projects and systems for several companies, as well as policy development for industrial and government clients. A technology start-up entrepreneur and manager, she is involved with improving the management of, and education about, Alberta’s water resources.

Education 
Sturgess graduated from Queen's University with a degree in engineering physics in 1977. As an undergraduate, she served as treasurer of Queen's Engineering Society Services. Later, she served on the university's council, its board of trustees, and its board of directors. In 1984, she received a master's degree from the University of Western Ontario. In 2006, she completed her ICD.D designation of the Institute of Corporate Directors.

Career 
Prior to attending the University of Western Ontario, Sturgess served in Alberta as an engineer with the National Energy Board and Esso Resources Canada Ltd. Subsequently, she served as an energy and transportation consultant with McKinsey & Company, before becoming involved in developing a series of startup engineering companies, including serving as chief executive officer (CEO) of Revolve Technologies and Revolve Magnetic Bearings.

Sturgess is the founder and CEO of WaterSMART Solutions Ltd., a service organization committed to the improvement of water management through better engineering. She also founded the Alberta WaterPortal Society, which provides water education internationally, and served as its executive director for 18 years.

Sturgess has served on the boards of the Calgary Airport Authority, the Canadian Chamber of Commerce, the National Research Council, the Pressure Pipeline Inspection Company, CCI Thermal Technologies, the Alberta Economic Development Authority, the Alberta Water Council, the Calgary Science Centre, the Chairman's Circle of the Southern Alberta Institute of Technology, the Alberta Chamber of Resources, the Sudbury Neutrino Observatory Laboratory, and the Queen's Centre for Enterprise Development.

She was inducted into the Canadian Academy of Engineering in 2004 and has served on its board since 2006. She has served on the Council of Canadian Academies, has been a reviewer for the Canadian Foundation for Innovation, and has participated in national and regional Innovation Forums.

Awards and recognition 
In 2016, Sturgess became a Member of the Order of Canada in recognition of her achievements and community service, and received an Honorary Doctor of Science degree from her alma mater, Queen's. In 2018, the University of Calgary awarded her an Honorary Doctor of Laws degree. Earlier, in 1999, she received the Queen's Distinguished Service Award and, in 2004, its Alumni Achievement Award.

Sturgess has been awarded the Queen Elizabeth II Platinum Jubilee Medal, the YWCA Women of Distinction Award for Science and Technology, the Queen Elizabeth II Diamond Jubilee Medal, and the Alberta Centennial Medal. She received the ASTech Outstanding Contribution to Alberta Science and Technology Community Award in 2016, and has been named in Canada's Top 100 Most Powerful Women and Women of Vision. In 2012, she was named the Outstanding Businesswoman in Calgary by the Consumers Choice Awards, and in 2021, she was listed as one of To Do Canada's 12 Inspirational Alberta Women You Should Know About. She is a member of the Young Presidents' Organization and the International Women's Forum.

In 2019, Sturgess was recognized as an Innovator by SHEInnovates in Alberta. She received the Leopold Nadeau Memorial Award for Distinguished Service from the Canadian Academy of Engineering in 2021. That same year, she was named in Foresight Canada’s Women Leading Cleantech, as well as in Pembina Institute’s Women in Energy Transformation.

References 

Year of birth missing (living people)
Living people
Canadian women engineers
Members of the Order of Canada
Fellows of the Canadian Academy of Engineering
Queen's University at Kingston alumni
University of Western Ontario alumni
21st-century women engineers